Guaianaza is a monotypic butterfly genus of the subfamily Satyrinae in the family Nymphalidae. Guaianaza is considered a synonym of the genus Forsterinaria Gray, 1973. Its single species, Guaianaza pronophila, is found in the Neotropical realm.

References

Euptychiina
Monotypic butterfly genera
Taxa named by Arthur Gardiner Butler